Dimensions & Extensions is an album by American saxophonist Sam Rivers recorded in 1967 but not released on the Blue Note label until 1986 with the original catalogue number and the intended cover artwork. It was originally scheduled for issue in 1967, but held back from release until 1975, when the tracks appeared as part of the double LP set, Involution (1976, BN-LA 453-H2), which combined them with tracks recorded under Andrew Hill's leadership that would eventually see release as Change.

Reception
The Allmusic review by Stephen Thomas Erlewine awarded the album 5 stars and stated "With music as risky as this, it's forgivable that it occasionally meanders (especially on the slower numbers) but, overall, Dimensions and Extensions offers more proof that Sam Rivers was one of the early giants of the avant-garde".

Track listing
All compositions by Sam Rivers
 "Precis" - 5:21
 "Paean" - 5:25
 "Effusive Melange" - 5:51
 "Involution" - 7:13
 "Afflatus" - 6:28
 "Helix" - 5:31

Personnel
Sam Rivers - tenor saxophone, soprano saxophone, flute
Donald Byrd - trumpet (tracks 1-3 & 6)
Julian Priester - trombone (tracks 1-3 & 6)
James Spaulding - alto saxophone, flute (tracks 1-4 & 6)
Cecil McBee - bass
Steve Ellington - drums

References

Blue Note Records albums
Sam Rivers (jazz musician) albums
1986 albums
Albums recorded at Van Gelder Studio
Albums produced by Alfred Lion